Nurcan Taylan (born 29 October 1983 in Ankara, Turkey) is a Turkish Olympic, world and European champion in weightlifting. She holds six European and one world record (and tied two more world records). She was banned by the International Weightlifting Federation (IWF) after she tested positive for the anabolic steroid Methandienone for two years starting on 26 October 2011.

Career
She was born in Mamak, Ankara as the third child of a poor family from the town of Hafik in Sivas,  Central Anatolia. Taylan was discovered at age of eleven by the Turkish national athlete and her later coach Mehmet Üstündağ as he was her teacher in physical education at the Mamak Secondary School in Ankara.

Taylan is Turkey's first ever female Olympic gold medalist.

Scandals
In September 2004, a Turkish court ordered the arrest of the coach of the Turkish women's weightlifting team, Mehmet Üstündağ, after three female athletes filed complaints of sexual harassment against him. In court, Üstündağ denied allegations of repeated physical sexual molestation going back several years, fielded by Sibel Şimşek, Aylin Daşdelen and Şule Şahbaz, all of them members of the Turkish women's team at the 2004 Athens Olympics.

But the court ordered him to be placed under detention in view of the "alleged crime's nature, the evidence collected and feelings of anger it has inspired in the public". The allegations first hit the media in early September when the three athletes gave extensive interviews to newspapers and television channels. Daşdelen told a television news program that Üstündağ also made it a habit of "beating" his charges, going so far as to blame the trainer for the 1999 suicide of teammate Esma Can. The only support for Üstündağ came from Taylan, who in turn "accused" her three teammates of being lesbians. Turkish sports officials immediately launched an official investigation. Üstündağ had come under investigation on similar charges four years ago, but the evidence was inconclusive. The Turkish Weightlifting Federation did not allow Taylan to participate at the 2005 European Weightlifting Championship held in Sofia, Bulgaria.

Doping case
She was banned by the International Weightlifting Federation (IWF) after she tested positive for the anabolic steroid Methandienone for four years starting on 26 October 2011. Taylan missed the London Olympics.

In October 2012, her suspension was shortened to two years that would allow her to return to action on 26 October 2013.

DQ and change results
Taylan disqualified (DQ) and all results were invalidated from 2008 Summer Olympics to 2016 Summer Olympics.

Major results
 Team Points: 28-25-23-22-21-20-19-18-17-16-15-14-13-12-11-10-9-8-7-6-5-4-3-2-1 points are distributed for the 1st to 25th place for the individual lifts and the total.

Achievements
Olyimpic Games

World Championships

European Championships

 Mediterranean Games   

J: Junior
CWR: Current world record
WR: World record
ER: European record
MR: Mediterranean record

World rank
2004 World ranking list for the category "Women 48 kg" is as following:

References

External links
 

1983 births
Living people
Sportspeople from Ankara
Turkish female weightlifters
Olympic weightlifters of Turkey
Weightlifters at the 2004 Summer Olympics
Weightlifters at the 2008 Summer Olympics
Olympic gold medalists for Turkey
World record holders in Olympic weightlifting
Olympic medalists in weightlifting
Doping cases in weightlifting
World Weightlifting Championships medalists
Turkish sportspeople in doping cases
European champions in weightlifting
Medalists at the 2004 Summer Olympics
European champions for Turkey
Mediterranean Games gold medalists for Turkey
Competitors at the 2005 Mediterranean Games
Competitors at the 2009 Mediterranean Games
Mediterranean Games medalists in weightlifting
European Weightlifting Championships medalists
21st-century Turkish sportswomen